Boghenii Noi is a commune in Ungheni District, Moldova. It is composed of five villages: Boghenii Noi, Boghenii Vechi, Izvoreni, Mircești and Poiana.

References

Communes of Ungheni District